A Harp in Hock, also known as The Samaritan, is a lost 1927 American silent melodrama film directed by Renaud Hoffman, produced by DeMille Pictures, and distributed by Pathé Exchange. The film starred Rudolph Schildkraut, Junior Coghlan, May Robson, and Bessie Love, and was based on the short story by Evelyn Campbell.

Plot 
In New York City, pawnbroker Isaac Abrams (Schildkraut) must take in an orphaned immigrant boy Tommy (Coghlan) after his mother (Bartlett) dies. Tommy assists at the pawn shop and goes to school, but after a fight with a bully, the bully's mother Mrs. Banks (Robson) reports him to authorities and has him sent to an orphanage.

Tommy escapes and returns to New York, where he upsets Mrs. Banks and a riot breaks out, but Abrams then adopts Tommy.

Cast

Reception 

The film received positive reviews, particularly the performances of Schildkraut and Coghlan.

References

External links 

 
 
 
 
 Window card from the film
 Still at gettyimages.com

1927 drama films
1927 lost films
1927 films
American black-and-white films
Silent American drama films
American silent feature films
Films based on short fiction
Films set in New York City
Films with screenplays by Sonya Levien
Lost American films
Lost drama films
Pathé Exchange films
Films directed by Renaud Hoffman
1920s American films